Michael and Cecilia Ibru University is a private university located in Agbara-Otor in Delta State. The University was established and founded in 2015 and was co-founded by Michael Ibru and Dr (Mrs) Cecilia Ibru, the couple founded the institution of learning with the aim of reducing poverty, the founders believes that 'Knowledge alleviates Poverty' and hence gave the institution the motto 'Knowledge alleviates Poverty'

Academic Division 
Michael and Cecilia Ibru University has a number of faculties and courses available, the National Universities Commission (NUC) approved 13 additional courses in 2021 to the institution, some of the courses approved includes LL.B Law, Marketing, Mass Communication, Microbiology, Public Administration and others.

The faculties in the University are listed below:

 Faculty of Arts and Humanities
 Faculty of Computing
 Faculty of Law
 Faculty of Management and Social Science
 Faculty of Natural and Applied Science

Vice Chancellor 
The vice chancellor of Michael and Cecilia Ibru University is Professor Ibiyinka Fuwape. The professor of Physics is the second substantive Vice-Chancellor of the Michael and Cecilia Ibru University, before her appointment as the Vice Chancellor of Michael and Cecilia Ibru University, she was a professor and Lecturer at Federal University of Technology, Akure and has written a lot of publication and even won prestigious award like African Union Scientific Excellence Award.

References 

Universities and colleges in Nigeria
Delta State
Education in Delta State